Malavika is a Tollywood playback singer. Malavika started her singing career with the song "Nuvvu nenu kalisunte" for the movie Gangotri. Malavika, who is a Nandi Award winner as the 'best playback singer' for the years 2006 and 2011 has sung for around 500 movies till date. She was also the winner of ETV Padutha Teeyaga as a child. She is regularly seen on shows like ETV Swarabhishekam, MAATV super singer series 7, 8, and 9.

Her hit songs include "Bommali", a chartbuster song from the movie Billa Amma avani (Rajanna), Sunday Monday( Khaleja),Vennelaina cheekataina( Prema Katta Chitram) and "Holessa" from Sri Ramadasu. Apart from these, she has sung many hit songs in Telugu. She has also sung a few songs in Kannada and Hindi. In fact her first song was an English song for the movie Rockford. Her next song was a Hindi songs for the movie Bollywood Calling.

Malavika started her training in music from her mother, a radio artist singer herself, at a very young age. Later on, she received classical training from Kum Mandapaka Sarada. Malavika did her schooling from Little Angels High School, MVP colony Visakhapatnam. Her mother taught music in the same school. They later shifted base to Hyderabad once Malavika started receiving offers from the film industry. Malavika, known for her distinctive voice, is considered hard-working. A recent recording in Hyderabad holds the following appreciation. The music director John Galt says, "Malavika is very much co-operative and does not get tired at all. She would be ready to sing a countless number of times in order to get what the composer required".

Discography

References

External links
 

Indian women playback singers
Living people
Singers from Andhra Pradesh
Musicians from Visakhapatnam
Film musicians from Andhra Pradesh
Telugu playback singers
Women musicians from Andhra Pradesh
Year of birth missing (living people)
21st-century Indian women singers
21st-century Indian singers
Musicians from Andhra Pradesh
Indian playback singers
Women from Andhra Pradesh